FCL-Web is part of Free Pascal's Free Component Library (FCL), focusing on web (related) application development. The package helps users to develop CGI, FastCGI and embedded web server applications, as well as Apache modules. It provides units implementing HTTP(S) protocol and a somewhat low level web application framework, in the form of web modules. Some content producers (e.g. for automatic content generation from dataset) are also provided. Other prominent use is to send/retrieve data from/to web services (possibly using JSON-RPC).

Web Application Support Units 
fpcgi, fpfcgi, fphttpapp and fpapache[24] are the units implementing CGI, FastCGI, embedded web server and Apache module respectively. The interface between the units is made similar by utilizing object oriented inheritance. Therefore, a change of used unit in the uses clause is sufficient to create all 4 kinds of web applications, without code changes for the most of the rest of the application. A notable exception might be the need to set port for FastCGI and embedded web server.

Other Units 
 httpdefs unit defines base classes for cookies, sessions, file uploads, mime handling, HTTP header, request & response
 iniwebsession unit implements session management using .ini files
 fphttpserver unit provides ready to use multithreaded-able standalone http server
 fphttpclient unit provides class to send http requests and retrieve its responses. It implements all available HTTP 1.1 methods.\
 fphtml unit provides content producers
 fphttp unit provides abstract web framework support using web modules
 fpweb unit provides an implementation of fphttp's abstract web framework

fpWeb Framework 

fpWeb is a framework built on top of fcl-web units and itself is a part of fcl-web. The architecture is quite modular and a RAD package for use with Lazarus is available. A fpWeb application consists of one or more web modules, with optional one or more web actions for each module.

The framework uses static routing in the form of:

<base URL>/<module name>[/<action name>]

<module name> is determined from the name given as argument to RegisterHTTPModule call, while <action name> is determined from the key in the action map of each module. As alternative, GET style routing is also supported:

<base URL>/?module=<module name>[&action=<action name>]

The string "module" and "action" can be configured through ModuleVariable and ActionVar, respectively.

Request handling is done in cascading manner using the following algorithm:
 Execute module's request handler (TFPWebModule.OnRequest)
 If the request is handled (TFPWebModule.OnRequest Handled parameter set to true), send the response
 Otherwise, delegate request handling to web actions
 Find web action corresponds to current request path, optionally use redirection/rewriting (TFPWebModule.OnGetAction)
 If found, execute the web action's request handler (TFPWebAction.OnRequest)
 If the request is handled (TFPWebAction.OnRequest Handled parameter set to true), send the response
 Otherwise, raise request not handled exception
 Otherwise, raise request not handled exception

References

Further reading 
 Leonardo M. Ramé: Lazarus Server
 Leonardo M. Ramé: Web Programming with Object Pascal
 Michaël Van Canneyt: Lazarus for the web
 Michaël Van Canneyt: Creating a simple webserver in Lazarus
 Mario Ray Mahardhika: Basic fpWeb Tutorial

Free Pascal
Pascal (programming language) libraries
Computer libraries